Marilyn Stark (born January 29, 1957) is an American politician who has served in the Oklahoma House of Representatives from the 100th district since 2018.

References

1957 births
Living people
Women state legislators in Oklahoma
Republican Party members of the Oklahoma House of Representatives
21st-century American politicians
21st-century American women politicians